

See also
 Lists of UK Singles Chart number ones
 Lists of UK Dance Singles Chart number ones
 List of UK Independent Singles Breakers Chart number ones of the 2010s
 List of UK Independent Album Breakers Chart number ones of the 2010s
 Lists of UK Independent Albums Chart number ones
 Lists of UK Singles Downloads Chart number ones
 Lists of UK Rock & Metal Singles Chart number ones
 Lists of UK R&B Singles Chart number ones

External links
Independent Singles Chart at the Official Charts Company
UK Top 30 Indie Singles at BBC Radio 1